In geometry, a pentagonal hexecontahedron is a Catalan solid, dual of the snub dodecahedron. It has two distinct forms, which are mirror images (or "enantiomorphs") of each other. It has 92 vertices that span 60 pentagonal faces. It is the Catalan solid with the most vertices. Among the Catalan and Archimedean solids, it has the second largest number of vertices, after the truncated icosidodecahedron, which has 120 vertices.

Cartesian coordinates

 Twelve vertices of a regular icosahedron with unit circumradius centered at the origin with the coordinates 
 Twenty vertices of regular dodecahedron of unit circumradius centered at the origin scaled by a factor from the exact solution to the equation , which gives the coordinates 
 and 
There are five sets of twelve vertices, all with even permutations (i.e. with a parity signature=1). 
A group of two sets of twelve have 0 or 2 minus signs (i.e. 1 or 3 plus signs): 

and another group of three sets of 12 have 0 or 2 plus signs (i.e. 1 or 3 minus signs): 
 

Negating all vertices in both groups gives the mirror of the chiral snub dodecahedron, yet results in the same pentagonal hexecontahedron convex hull.

Construction 

The pentagonal hexecontahedron can be constructed from a snub dodecahedron without taking the dual. Pentagonal pyramids are added to the 12 pentagonal faces of the snub dodecahedron, and triangular pyramids are added to the 20 triangular faces that do not share an edge with a pentagon. The pyramid heights are adjusted to make them coplanar with the other 60 triangular faces of the snub dodecahedron. The result is the pentagonal hexecontahedron.

An alternate construction method uses quaternions and the icosahedral symmetry of the Weyl group orbits  of order 60. 
This is shown in the figure on the right.

Geometry

The faces are irregular pentagons with two long edges and three short edges. Let  be the real zero of the polynomial .
Then the ratio  of the edge lengths is given by:
. 
The faces have four equal obtuse angles and one acute angle (between the two long edges). The obtuse angles equal , and the acute one equals . The dihedral angle equals .
Note that the face centers of the snub dodecahedron cannot serve directly as vertices of the pentagonal hexecontahedron: the four triangle centers lie in one plane but the pentagon center does not; it needs to be radially pushed out to make it coplanar with the triangle centers. Consequently, the vertices of the pentagonal hexecontahedron do not all lie on the same sphere and by definition it is not a zonohedron.

Then the surface area (A) is:

.

And the volume (V) is:

.

Using these, one can calculate the measure of sphericity for this shape:

Variations
Isohedral variations can be constructed with pentagonal faces with 3 edge lengths.

This variation shown can be constructed by adding pyramids to 12 pentagonal faces and 20 triangular faces of a snub dodecahedron such that the new triangular faces are coparallel to other triangles and can be merged into the pentagon faces.

Orthogonal projections
The pentagonal hexecontahedron has three symmetry positions, two on vertices, and one mid-edge.

Related polyhedra and tilings

This polyhedron is topologically related as a part of sequence of polyhedra and tilings of pentagons with face configurations (V3.3.3.3.n). (The sequence progresses into tilings the hyperbolic plane to any n.) These face-transitive figures have (n32) rotational symmetry.

See also
Truncated pentagonal hexecontahedron
Amazon Spheres

References

 (Section 3-9)
 (The thirteen semiregular convex polyhedra and their duals, Page 29, Pentagonal hexecontahedron)
The Symmetries of Things 2008, John H. Conway, Heidi Burgiel, Chaim Goodman-Strauss,   (Chapter 21, Naming the Archimedean and Catalan polyhedra and tilings, page 287, pentagonal hexecontahedron )

External links

Pentagonal Hexecontrahedron – Interactive Polyhedron Model

Catalan solids
Chiral polyhedra